Roslyatino is the name of several rural localities in Vologda Oblast, Russia:
Roslyatino, Babushkinsky District, Vologda Oblast, a selo in Roslyatinsky Selsoviet of Babushkinsky District
Roslyatino, Vologodsky District, Vologda Oblast, a village in Veprevsky Selsoviet of Vologodsky District